Azimabad is the former name of Patna, India.

Azimabad  may also refer to:
Azimabad, Ardabil
Azimabad, Kermanshah
Azimabad, Mazandaran
Azimabad, Razavi Khorasan
Azimabad, Tehran
Qaleh-ye Azimabad, Tehran Province
Azimabad, Yazd